Sergio Graziani (10 November 1930 – 25 May 2018) was an Italian actor and voice actor.

Biography
Graziani attended the Silvio d'Amico National Academy of Dramatic Arts, and began his career on stage in the late 1950s, working as well as a voice actor: he dubbed Donald Sutherland and Peter O'Toole in most of their performances.

In 1999 he gave his voice to Professor Farnsworth from Futurama for the first five seasons of the show, until he was replaced by Mino Caprio in the second run of the show.

Retirement and death
Graziani officially retired from his career in 2014 and he died in Rome on 25 May 2018, at the age of 87.

Filmography

Cinema
 Il vedovo (1959) - (voice, uncredited)
 Le sette vipere (Il marito latino) (1964) - (voice, uncredited)
 The Birds, the Bees and the Italians (1966) - (voice, uncredited)
 A Complicated Girl (1969) - Greta's boyfriend
 The Divorce (1970) - (voice, uncredited)
 The Scalawag Bunch (1971) - (voice, uncredited)
 The Case Is Closed, Forget It (1971) - (voice, uncredited)
 The Assassin of Rome (1972) - (voice, uncredited)
 My Pleasure Is Your Pleasure (1973) - Francis I of France (uncredited)
 The Five Days (1973) - Baron Tranzunto
 Libera, My Love (1975) - Franco Testa (voice, uncredited)
 Goodnight, Ladies and Gentlemen (1976) - Cardinal Cannaregio (uncredited)
 Porca vacca (1982) - Tomo Secondo (voice)
 Piccolo grande amore (1993)
 The Butterfly's Dream (1994) - L'ortolano
 It Can't Be All Our Fault (2003) - Camillo Tinacci
 Secret File (2003) - Professore
 Segretario particolare (2007) - Davide
 Tutta colpa della musica (2011) - Zaccaria
The Unlikely Prince (2013) - old Count (final film role)

Dubbing roles

Animation
Professor Farnsworth in Futurama (seasons 1–5)
Professor Farnsworth in Futurama: Bender's Big Score
Professor Farnsworth in Futurama: The Beast With a Billion Backs
Professor Farnsworth in Futurama: Bender's Game
Professor Farnsworth in Futurama: Into the Wild Green Yonder
Meowrice in Gay Purr-ee
Stan's grandfather in South Park
Dr. Vosknocker in South Park: Bigger, Longer & Uncut
Mr. Bloomsberry in Curious George

Live action
Agar in The First Great Train Robbery
Hawkeye Pierce in MASH
Matthew Bennell in Invasion of the Body Snatchers
Lucien Wilbanks in A Time to Kill
X in JFK
Flan Kittredge in Six Degrees of Separation
Lieutenant Stanton in Fallen
Sergeant "Oddball" in Kelly's Heroes
John Klute in Klute
Bruland in S*P*Y*S
Donald McClintock in Outbreak
Ben Hillard in Instinct
Robert Everton in Virus
Jack Shaw in The Assignment
Rosario Sarracino in Five Moons Square
Hellfrick in Ask the Dust
Gonville Bromhead in Zulu
Captain Douglas in Play Dirty
The Captain in The Last Valley
John Deray in The Marseille Contract
Jim Keogh in The Wilby Conspiracy
Frank Bryant in Educating Rita
Noel Holcroft in The Holcroft Covenant
Sam Bulbeck in Half Moon Street
Hoagie Newcombe in Jaws: The Revenge
Lawrence Jamieson in Dirty Rotten Scoundrels
Nigel Bigelow in Bewitched
Jack Geller in Friends
T. E. Lawrence in Lawrence of Arabia
King Henry II in Becket
Lord Jim in Lord Jim
Michael James in What's New Pussycat?
King Henry II in The Lion in Winter
Simon Dermott in How to Steal a Million
Jack Gurney in The Ruling Class
Viscount Chelmsford in Zulu Dawn
Timothy Flyte in Phantoms
Priam in Troy
Maurice Russell in Venus
King of Stormhold in Stardust
Karl-Heinz Zimmer in That Most Important Thing: Love
Doc Foster in A Genius, Two Partners and a Dupe
Count Dracula in Nosferatu the Vampyre
Friedrich Johann Franz Woyzeck in Woyzeck
El Santo in A Bullet for the General
Brent in The Ruthless Four
Gary Hamilton in And God Said to Cain
Quintero in Gangster's Law
James Webb in Black Killer
Edgar Allan Poe in Web of the Spider
Adam in The Cats
Judge Rousseau in The Judge and the Assassin
Philippe in La Grande Bouffe
General Terry in Don't Touch the White Woman!
Philippe d'Orléans in On Guard
Knut Straud in The Heroes of Telemark
Dr. Jonathan Chamberlain in The Cassandra Crossing
Captain Nolan in Orca
Paddy O'Neil in Patriot Games
Benjamin Tyreen in Major Dundee
Rafer Janders in The Wild Geese
Bill Parker in Mulholland Falls
Charlie in Down in the Valley
Woody Grant in Nebraska
Hercule Poirot in Appointment with Death
Gus Nikolais in Lorenzo's Oil
Frederick III in Luther
Walter Harper in Topkapi
Cardinal Alba in Vampires
Arkady Shapira in Little Odessa
Julius Edmund Santorin in A Little Romance
Dr. Jan Spaander in A Bridge Too Far
Spock Prime in Star Trek
Spock Prime in Star Trek Into Darkness
Philip Marlowe in Farewell, My Lovely
Lieutenant Elgart in Cape Fear
Kurt Dussander in Apt Pupil
James Whale in Gods and Monsters
Peck in Night and the City
Sheldon Dodge in Two Much
Abraham Whistler in Blade II
Abraham Whistler in Blade: Trinity
Caesar in Gattaca
Ted Denslow in BASEketball
S.R. Hadden in Contact
Benjamin Devereaux in The Skeleton Key
Lasker-Jones in Maurice
Fagin in Oliver Twist
John Clayton's grandfather in Greystoke: The Legend of Tarzan, Lord of the Apes
Sir Charles Litton in The Return of the Pink Panther
Mathieu in That Obscure Object of Desire
Ace Hanlon in The Quick and the Dead
Pyotr Ilyich Tchaikovsky in The Music Lovers
Toot-Toot in The Green Mile
Major Harriman in They Call Me Trinity
Laurent Ségur in The Christmas Tree
Tommy Haskins in The Anderson Tapes
Matthew Scudder in 8 Million Ways to Die
Bill Dolworth in The Professionals
John McGregor in Phenomena
Phil Benton in Madame X
Henry L. Stimson in Tora! Tora! Tora!
George Armstrong Custer in Little Big Man
Malvolio in Twelfth Night
Guy Montag in Fahrenheit 451
Marshal Sam MacKenna in Mackenna's Gold
Chief Judge Fargo in Judge Dredd
Bobby Bartellemeo in The Crew
Franco "Cookie" Arnò  in The Cat o' Nine Tails
Montero in Bad Man's River
Three-fingered Jack in The Mask of Zorro
Gerald Crich in Women in Love
Mr. Vogler in Persona
Mike in Red Line 7000
Mary Ann in Prime Cut
Graham Keightley in The Paper
Jack Woltz in The Godfather
Mark Van Doren in Quiz Show
Jonathan Kent in Superman
John N. Mitchell in Nixon
Harry Greenberg in Bugsy
Lord Lendale in Lady L
Dr. Vijav Alezais in Wolf

Video games
Professor Farnsworth in Futurama

References

External links

 
 

1930 births
2018 deaths
People from Udine
Italian male voice actors
Italian male film actors
Italian male stage actors
Italian voice directors
20th-century Italian male actors
21st-century Italian male actors
Accademia Nazionale di Arte Drammatica Silvio D'Amico alumni